The Toxic Avenger may refer to:

 The Toxic Avenger (franchise)
 The Toxic Avenger (1984 film), a 1984 American superhero comedy splatter film
 The Toxic Avenger (upcoming film), an upcoming American superhero comedy horror film
 The Toxic Avenger (musical), based on the film 
 The Toxic Avenger (musician) (Simon Delacroix, born 1982), French DJ and producer

See also
 Toxic Crusaders, an animated TV series based on the films
 All I Need to Know About Filmmaking I Learned from The Toxic Avenger, the 1998 autobiography of Lloyd Kaufman